NAFL or Nafl may refer to:

Sports
National-American Football League, a name briefly used by the National Football League
North American Football League, an American football league
North American Soccer Football League, an association football league also known as the North American Football League
Northern Amateur Football League, an association football league in Northern Ireland
North American Floorball League, an American floorball league

Other uses
National Academy For Learning, a school in Bangalore

See also
Nafl salat, an optional form of Islamic worship